Bikker is a Dutch surname. Notable people with the surname include:

 Herbertus Bikker (1915–2008), Dutch war criminal
 Mirjam Bikker (born 1982), Dutch politician

Dutch-language surnames